{{DISPLAYTITLE:C13H18N2O}}
The molecular formula C13H18N2O (molar mass : 218.29 g/mol, exact mass : 218.141913) may refer to :

 Bufotenidine
 Eseroline
 Fenoxazoline
 4-HO-MET
 Lespedamine
 5-MeO-AET
 4-MeO-DMT
 5-Methoxy-N,N-dimethyltryptamine, a psychedelic tryptamine
 1-Methylpsilocin
 α,N,O-TMS